Thailand was the host nation for the 1998 Asian Games in Bangkok on 6–20 December 1998. Thailand ended the games at 90 overall medals including 24 gold medals which is the best showing of Thailand ever since inception of Asian Games in 1951.

Nations at the 1998 Asian Games
1998
Asian Games